Jakovljević is a South Slavic patronymic surname derived from a masculine given name Jakov. It may refer to:

Stevan Jakovljević (born 1890), author, biologist and professor
Anto Jakovljević (born 1962), football goalkeeper
Dragan Jakovljević (born 1962), footballer
Ivan Jakovljević (born 1989), footballer
Robi Jakovljević (born 1993), footballer
Slobodan Jakovljević (born 1989), footballer
Zvonko Jakovljević (born 1996), footballer

Croatian surnames
Serbian surnames
Surnames from given names